D 92, also known as Al Khaleej Road, Al Mina Road or Al Wasl Road, is a road in Dubai, United Arab Emirates.  Beginning in the locality of Al Mamzar, D 92 progresses south-westward, past Deira, Al Shindagha, Port Rashid and Bur Dubai. D 92 then runs parallel to D 94 (Jumeirah Road) and D 90 (Satwa Road) before terminating at a junction with Umm Suqeim Street in Umm Suqeim. The road, which passes through Al Shindagha Tunnel, provides access to Bur Dubai.  

Important landmarks located along D 92 include the Dubai Gold Souk, Al Shindagha Tunnel, Falcon Roundabout, Iranian Consulate, American School of Dubai, Al Wasl Police Station, Safa Park and Dubai Police Academy.

Roads in the United Arab Emirates
Transport in Dubai